Telzey Amberdon is a fictional character in a series of science fiction short stories and two short novels by American writer James H. Schmitz, taking place in his "Federation of the Hub" fictional universe, presumably in the mid-4th millennium. She is introduced as a fifteen-year-old genius, a first-year law student, living on the human-settled planet Orado (whose name comes from Eldorado by a pun). Through interaction with alien psychic animals on a resort planet, she discovers that she has psychic powers. Upon her return to her home planet, her abilities are recognized by a mechanism at the spaceport reentry gate and she is effectively made an agent of the Psychology Service. 
A major pattern in the stories is the development of her powers. Eventually she teams up with the redheaded secret agent Trigger Argee. The series ends inconclusively; in the last story, a villain makes a duplicate of her, who gains a separate identity and name.

The series features one of the few imaginings (the "ComWeb") of the internet before its existence—although the system takes a half-hour to download a document of modest length.

The Telzey stories were originally published in Analog Science Fiction and Fact between 1962 and 1972. The series was quite popular, often getting the cover illustration. Most of it was assembled in three books: The Universe Against Her (short story collection, Ace Books 1964), The Lion Game (short novel) and The Telzey Toy (short story collection) (both DAW Books 1973).

In 2000 all of the Telzey and Trigger stories were republished by Baen Books, "edited and compiled" by Eric Flint into three collections with some connecting material by Flint: Telzey Amberdon, T'nT: Telzey & Trigger (where both heroes feature) and Trigger & Friends (dated January 2001, for Trigger only). The books remained in print as of June 2007. They were made available for download at Baen Free Library in 2005, but are no longer downloadable in 2016.

Stories

T'nT: Telzey & Trigger includes as Prologue to "Compulsion" the Trigger-only story "The Pork Chop Tree", originally published in February 1965 Analog.

Books
 James H. Schmitz: The Universe Against Her. Ace Books (Berkley Publishing Group) 1964.  (1984 reissue).
 The Lion Game. DAW Books 1973.
 The Telzey Toy. DAW 1973.
 James H. Schmitz, edited and compiled by Eric Flint: Telzey Amberdon. Baen Books, New York April 2000. . Partial text in Baen Free Library.
 James H. Schmitz, edited by first Eric Flint: T'n'T: Telzey & Trigger. Baen Books, July 2000.

References

External links
 Review of Telzey Amberdon at SF Site
"Telzey Amberdon, age 15, is a genius, a law student, and a psi supergirl who can save the Federation in a fortnight, and still make it home in time for her sixteenth birthday party."
 Telzey Amberdon on Schmitz fan website; includes her picture by Frank Kelly Freas and scans of covers and illustrations of individual stories on subpages
 Original Edition of edited Schmitz Stories in Baen Free Library (not free as of 2016) – contains "Undercurrents", "Poltergeist", "The Star Hyacinths" and Trigger-only novel Legacy

 Telzey Amberdon series in William G. Contento's Index to Science Fiction Anthologies and Collections
 Telzey Amberdon series in Locus Index to Science Fiction: 2000 and in the 1984–98 volume

Amberdon, Telzey
Science fiction short story collections
2000 short story collections
Fictional telepaths